"I'm Not the Only One" is a 2014 song by Sam Smith.

I'm Not the Only One may also refer to:

 I'm Not the Only One (book), a 2004 autobiography of George Galloway
 "I'm Not the Only One", a song by Rene and Rene, composed by Milt Lance 1965 
 "I'm Not the Only One", a song by Rancid from the EP Rancid 1992
 "I'm Not the Only One", a song by Laura Branigan, composed by D. Warren, from the album Branigan 2 1983
 "I'm Not the Only One", a song by Filter, composed R. Patrick, from the album Title of Record 1999, also Filter: The Very Best Things (1995-2008)
 "I'm Not the Only One", a song by Atlanta Rhythm Section, composed by Buddy Buie & Ronnie Hammond, from Truth in a Structured Form 1989 and Eufaula (album) 1999
 "I'm Not the Only One", a single by Ed Hale and The Transcendence from Sleep With You 2003

See also
 Not the Only One (disambiguation)
 "Imagine" (John Lennon song), containing the line "I'm not the only one"
 "Rape Me" (Nirvana song), containing the line "I'm not the only one"